Shedrack Kibet Korir (born 14 December 1978 in Nandi District) is a Kenyan runner who specializes in the 1500 and 3000 metres.

He won the bronze medal in the 1500m at the 2007 World Championships in Osaka.

He is based at the PACE Sports Management training camp in Kaptagat.

Competition record

Personal bests
1500 metres - 3:31.18 min (2007)
3000 metres - 7:37.50 min (2006)
5000 metres - 13:09.92 min (2005)

External links

Pace Sports Management

1978 births
Living people
Kenyan male middle-distance runners
World Athletics Championships medalists
People from Nandi County